Erica Page is an American actress and model. She is known for her role as Bella Tru in the Oprah Winfrey Network prime time soap opera, Ambitions.

Life and career 
Page is the oldest of nine children and comes from Mexican/American heritage. She began her career with a recurring role in the BET comedy series The Game in 2012, and later played secondary roles in Sleepy Hollow, The Vampire Diaries, Saints & Sinners, and Nashville. Her film credits including Mr. Right (2015), Blue Mountain State: The Rise of Thadland (2016) and Office Christmas Party (2016).

In 2018, Page had a recurring role in the Oprah Winfrey Network prime time soap opera If Loving You Is Wrong and guest-starred in the CW prime time soap opera Dynasty. In 2019, Page was cast in two series regular roles. First, on the Bounce TV comedy series Last Call opposite Charles Malik Whitfield and Brely Evans. Later that year, she began starring in the Oprah Winfrey Network prime time soap opera, Ambitions playing the role of fashion designer Bella Tru, the mistress of Atlanta Mayor Evan Lancaster (Brian J. White).

References

External links 

21st-century American actresses
American television actresses
American soap opera actresses
Living people
Year of birth missing (living people)